Max Alves da Silva (born 12 May 2001), simply known as Max, is a Brazilian footballer who plays as an attacking midfielder for Colorado Rapids.

Career

Early career
Born in Juiz de Fora, Minas Gerais, Max Alves joined Flamengo's youth setup in January 2020, from Tupi.

Flamengo
Max Alves made his first team debut on 3 March 2021, coming on as a second-half substitute for Daniel Cabral in a 1–0 Campeonato Carioca home win over Nova Iguaçu, and also scoring the game's only goal. He made his Série A debut on 13 June, replacing Bruno Henrique late into a 2–0 home success over América Mineiro.

Cuiabá (loan)
On 17 September 2021, Max Alves was loaned to fellow top tier side Cuiabá until the end of the year.

Colorado Rapids
On 6 January 2022, Max Alves signed a four-year deal with MLS side Colorado Rapids.

Career statistics

Honours

Club
Flamengo
Campeonato Carioca: 2021

References

External links

2001 births
Living people
People from Juiz de Fora
Brazilian footballers
Association football midfielders
Campeonato Brasileiro Série A players
CR Flamengo footballers
Cuiabá Esporte Clube players
Colorado Rapids players
Colorado Rapids 2 players
Brazilian expatriate footballers
Brazilian expatriate sportspeople in the United States
Major League Soccer players
Sportspeople from Minas Gerais
MLS Next Pro players